Janne Suokonautio (born 20 May 1968) is a Finnish former footballer.

He played 12 seasons in the Finnish premier division Veikkausliiga for HJK, PPT, Kumu, FC Haka, FinnPa and PK-35. 1990/1991 Suokonautio was on loan for Eendracht Aalst in the Belgian Second Division and 1996/1997 for Hvidovre IF in the Danish Superliga. He played also for Maccabi Ironi Ashdod in the Israeli top division Liga Leumit. Suokonautio capped 4 times for the Finland national team.

Honors 
Finnish Championship: 1987, 1988, 1990, 1992

References 

1968 births
People from Outokumpu
Finnish footballers
Finland international footballers
Veikkausliiga players
Challenger Pro League players
Danish Superliga players
FC Honka players
Helsingin Jalkapalloklubi players
FC Jazz players
FC Haka players
FinnPa players
Hvidovre IF players
Maccabi Ironi Ashdod F.C. players
PK-35 Vantaa (men) players
S.C. Eendracht Aalst players
Living people
Association football midfielders
Finnish expatriate footballers
Expatriate footballers in Belgium
Expatriate men's footballers in Denmark
Expatriate footballers in Israel
Finnish expatriate sportspeople in Belgium
Finnish expatriate sportspeople in Denmark
Finnish expatriate sportspeople in Israel
Sportspeople from North Karelia